In enzymology, a beta-alanine-pyruvate transaminase is an enzyme that catalyzes the chemical reaction

L-alanine + 3-oxopropanoate  pyruvate + beta-alanine

Thus, the two substrates of this enzyme are L-alanine and 3-oxopropanoate, whereas its two products are pyruvate and beta-alanine.

This enzyme belongs to the family of transferases, specifically the transaminases, which transfer nitrogenous groups.  The systematic name of this enzyme class is L-alanine:3-oxopropanoate aminotransferase. Other names in common use include beta-alanine-pyruvate aminotransferase, and beta-alanine-alpha-alanine transaminase.  This enzyme participates in 4 metabolic pathways: alanine and aspartate metabolism, valine, leucine and isoleucine degradation, beta-alanine metabolism, and propanoate metabolism.  It employs one cofactor, pyridoxal phosphate.

References

 
 

EC 2.6.1
Pyridoxal phosphate enzymes
Enzymes of unknown structure